The RCD Cup 1970 was the fourth edition of the RCD Cup professional football tournament, held in Tehran, Iran in 1970. This was a three-nation tournament played in league format between Iran, Pakistan, and Turkey XI.

In this tournament, Turkey did not send their senior national team and was represented by the under-23 team

Venue

Results

Top scorers 
3 Goals
 Mehdi Hajmohammad

Squads

Iran 

Head coach:   Mahmoud Bayati

Pakistan

Turkey

References 
RSSSF Page on RCD Cup tournament
TeamMelli.com page for squad list
NationalFootballTeams

1970
1970
1970 in Asian football
1970–71 in Turkish football
1970–71 in Iranian football
1970 in Pakistani sport